ABC 28 may refer to one of the following television stations in the United States affiliated with the American Broadcasting Company:

Current
KAMC in Lubbock, Texas
KZKC-LD in Bakersfield, California
Local translator for KERO-TV
WFTS-TV in Tampa / St. Petersburg, Florida

Former
WSJV in Elkhart / South Bend, Indiana (1954 to 1995)
WVTX-CD (DT2) in Bridgeport, Ohio (2013 to 2017)
Simulcast of WTRF-DT3 in Wheeling, West Virginia